Valentina Iliffe (born 17 February 1956 in Sydney, Australia) is a British former alpine skier who competed in the 1972 Winter Olympics, in the 1976 Winter Olympics, and in the 1980 Winter Olympics.

References

External links
 

1956 births
Living people
Skiers from Sydney
British female alpine skiers
Olympic alpine skiers of Great Britain
Alpine skiers at the 1972 Winter Olympics
Alpine skiers at the 1976 Winter Olympics
Alpine skiers at the 1980 Winter Olympics